Aquatic is the third album by Australian improvised music trio The Necks released on the Fish of Milk label in 1994 and reissued on the Carpet Bomb label in the US in 1999. The album features two tracks, both titled "Aquatic", performed by Chris Abrahams, Lloyd Swanton and Tony Buck with the addition of Steve Wishart playing hurdy-gurdy on the second.

Reception
The Wire review described the album as "Real splendour...a hugely mature album, a rare spark of brilliance...a marvel".

Track listing 
All compositions by The Necks.
 "Aquatic I" - 27:38
 "Aquatic II" - 25:30

Personnel 
 Chris Abrahams – piano, hammond organ
 Lloyd Swanton – bass
 Tony Buck – drums
 Steve Wishart – hurdy-gurdy (track 2)

References 

1994 albums
The Necks albums